The Kumsusan Palace of the Sun, formerly the Kumsusan Memorial Palace, is a building near the northeast corner of the city of Pyongyang that serves as the mausoleum for Kim Il-sung, the founder of North Korea, and for his son Kim Jong-il, both posthumously designated as Eternal leaders of North Korea (Eternal President and Eternal General Secretary, respectively).

Overview
Inside the palace, Kim Il-sung's embalmed body lies inside a clear glass sarcophagus. His head rests on a traditional Korean buckwheat pillow and his body is covered by the flag of the Workers' Party of Korea. Kim Jong-il is now on display in a room close to his father's remains and positioned in a very similar way. 

At , Kumsusan is the largest mausoleum dedicated to a Communist leader and the only one to house the remains of multiple people. It is bordered on its northern and eastern sides by a moat.

Not far from the palace are the Kumsusan Guest Palace which was built in 2019 and used by Xi Jinping and the older, Paekhwawon Guesthouse, which was used by South Korean President Moon Jae-in, U.S. Secretary of State Mike Pompeo and Russian foreign minister Sergey Lavrov.

History 
The palace was built in 1976 as the Kumsusan Assembly Hall and served as Kim Il-sung's official residence. Following the elder Kim's death in 1994, Kim Jong-il had the building renovated and transformed into his father's mausoleum. It is believed that the conversion cost at least $100 million. Some sources put the figure as high as $900 million.

Access and rules 

Foreign visitors can access the palace only on an official government tour. Photography, videotaping, and smoking are not permitted anywhere inside the palace. The palace plaza, though, is open all week, and is a venue for national rallies.

The building is accessed via an underpass adjacent to a tram stop across the road. Upon entering the building, visitors (both foreigners and North Korean tourists) have to walk over a shoe cleaning device, are asked to check all personal belongings except their wallets in a cloak room, and are given a numbered ticket to claim their belongings when leaving. Visitors proceed along a series of long travelators.

Until 2015, visitors had to emerge in a long hall with two white marble statues of the Kims bathed in soft red light. This was replaced by a 3D-styled portrait of the Kims with Mount Paektu in the background, with national and party flags flanking them. Marble arched columns line the hall. Visitors are told to stop at a yellow line on the floor and, after a few moments of contemplation, beckoned into another room. Here, they are given small speaker devices that play a narration of the Korean people's grief when Kim Il-sung died. The room features bronze-like busts of people grieving. Finally, visitors go in a lift to the top floor in the white and grey marble-walled building. They are filed through a dust blowing machine and enter the rooms with the preserved remains of Kim Il-sung and Kim Jong-il lying in state. A red rope barrier runs around the transparent crystal sarcophagus. Visitors are sent in groups of four and are told to bow at Kim Il-sung's feet, to his left, and then right side. Visitors then file into a museum room containing awards and honours given to Kim in his lifetime by foreign countries, universities, friendship associations etc. This sequence is then repeated on the lower level where a nearly identical set of rooms contain the sarcophagus of Kim Jong-il, and rooms wherein similar memorabilia of him can be seen.

Mementos 
Adjoining rooms are filled with some of Kim Il-sung's possessions, as well as gifts and awards he received from around the world. There are no signs or information in Korean here. Awards include degree certificates, only one of which is from a Western university: Kensington University in California. (Kensington was an unaccredited university, typically considered to be a diploma mill, which, following two years of attempts to close it, was ordered to close by a California regulator in 1996, reopened the same year in Hawaii, and dissolved by a Hawaiian court in 2003.)

A peace medal from Japan lies next to his Medal "For the Victory over Japan" awarded to him by the Soviet Union. The room has large paintings and photographs of Kim Il-sung meeting world leaders during their visits to North Korea and during Kim's trips abroad, such as Hosni Mubarak of Egypt, Colonel Muammar Gaddafi of Libya, Chairman Mao Zedong of China, Nicolae Ceauşescu of Romania, General Secretary and Chairman Erich Honecker of the former East Germany, Gustáv Husák of the former Czechoslovakia, Wojciech Jaruzelski of Poland, Todor Zhivkov of Bulgaria, János Kádár of Hungary, Fidel Castro of Cuba, Josip Broz Tito of former Yugoslavia, Houari Boumediene of Algeria, Moktar Ould Daddah of Mauritania and Yasser Arafat of Palestine, as well as several former Soviet leaders, including Joseph Stalin, Nikita Khrushchev, Leonid Brezhnev, Konstantin Chernenko, Mikhail Gorbachev and many other well-known people including Che Guevara and former U.S. president Jimmy Carter.

Death of Kim Il-sung 

On the early morning of 8 July 1994, Kim Il-sung collapsed in Hyangsan from a sudden heart attack. After the heart attack, his son Kim Jong-il ordered the team of doctors who were constantly at his father's side to leave, and arranged for the country's best doctors to be flown in from Pyongyang.

Death of Kim Jong-il 

Following the death of Kim Jong-il in December 2011, his body lay in state at the palace for 10 days.  Following this period, on 28 December 2011, the palace served as the start and end point for a  funeral procession lasting three hours. The procession marked the first day of a two-day funeral ceremony.

Reportedly, Russian experts were brought to the mausoleum to embalm Kim Jong-il's body for permanent display in the same manner of his father and other former Communist leaders such as Vladimir Lenin, Mao Zedong, Ho Chi Minh, and Joseph Stalin (until 1961 when he was buried in the Kremlin Wall Necropolis).

On 12 January 2012, the North Korean government confirmed that Kim Jong-il's preserved remains would be put on permanent display in the palace and announced plans to erect a new Kim Jong-il statue and construct "towers to his immortality".

On 16 February 2012, the 70th diamond anniversary of the birth of Kim Jong-il, the building was formally renamed the Kumsusan Palace of the Sun by a combined act of the North Korean cabinet and parliament, and the Workers' Party of Korea leadership, which was read aloud. A military parade by the Korean People's Army held that day in the palace grounds formally celebrated the occasion of its formal relaunch, preceded by a fireworks display.

After months of renovations, on December 17, 2012, Kim Jong-il's first death anniversary, the palace was officially reopened to the public in a ceremony. The preserved remains of Kim Jong-il are now shown to the public in a separate room, as well as several items related to him and documents made by him personally. The palace contains exhibits of his personal vehicles, outfits, and medals and decorations, which have now been added to the expanded collection as part of a reorganization. The wide empty foyer, formerly used in state ceremonies, was turned into a park with fountains and walkways for the enjoyment of visitors. A plaza is now at its center.

In addition to internal improvements, the palace grounds were renovated and turned into an expansive park and flower garden for the benefit of visitors. The construction and design of the park was reportedly directed by Kim Jong-un. The park grounds are open to locals and visitors alike.

On 2 April 2013, the Supreme People's Assembly on its plenary session for the year formally made a full amendment to the North Korean Constitution on the status of the palace and passed the Kumsusan Palace of the Sun Organic Law and its corresponding SPA Ordinance formally declaring the palace as a national landmark, defining its status and its mission and vision, and prepared measures to maintain it for the benefit of Koreans and foreign tourists as well as the duties of the citizens of North Korea towards this memorial edifice.

See also 

 Sun Yat-sen Mausoleum
 Chiang Kai-shek Memorial Hall
 Cihu Mausoleum
 Touliao Mausoleum
 Ho Chi Minh Mausoleum
 The Laos National Cemetery in Xaythany, Vientiane
 Kaysone Phomvihane Museum
 Lenin's Mausoleum
 Mausoleum of Mao Zedong
 Sükhbaatar's Mausoleum
 Georgi Dimitrov Mausoleum
 National Monument in Vitkov
 Agostinho Neto's Mausoleum
 Valle de los Caídos
 Pyramid of Tirana
 House of Flowers (mausoleum)
 El Museo Histórico Militar de Caracas
 Anıtkabir
 Mazar-e-Quaid
 Bourguiba mausoleum
 Alley of Honor
 Türkmenbaşy Ruhy Mosque
 Kwame Nkrumah Mausoleum
 National Heroes Acre
 Mausoleum of Khomeini
 Marcos Museum and Mausoleum
 Mangyongdae
 Mansu Hill Grand Monument
 Grand People's Study House
 International Friendship Exhibition
 Kimilsungia and Kimjongilia Exhibition Hall
 Revolutionary Martyrs' Cemetery
 Patriotic Martyrs' Cemetery
 Seoul National Cemetery
 Day of the Shining Star
 Day of the Sun

References

Citations

Sources

Further reading

External links

 Kim Il Sung-Kim Jong Il Foundation  at Naenara
 360-degree panorama image at DPRK 360
 In-depth tourist visit at Earth Nutshell
 

Buildings and structures in Pyongyang
Monuments and memorials in North Korea
Mausoleums in North Korea
Kim Il-sung
Kim Jong-il
Buildings and structures completed in 1976
1976 establishments in North Korea
20th-century architecture in North Korea